Kosov is the name of a Hasidic dynasty founded by Rabbi Menachem Mendel Hager of Kosiv, a town in Galicia, presently in Ukraine.

The Kosov Hasidic dynasty, Rabbi Mendel of Kosov's descendants, founded the many Kosov Hasidic sects. The Vizhnitz dynasty is the best known branch of the original Kosover dynasty. Other branches include Seret.

Among the many contemporary descendants of the Kosov dynasty, two are called "the Kosover Rebbe": Rabbi Shraga Feivish Hager of Borough Park, Brooklyn, where he has a substantial following and presides at his tish, and Rabbi Menachem Monderer of Jerusalem (died 2013). There is also a historic Kosover synagogue in Tzfas (Safed), Israel, which, however, is run by followers of the Biala Rebbe of Lugano, Switzerland.

Dynasty

Grand Rabbi Menachem Mendel Hager of Kosov (d. 1825), author of Ahavas Sholom—son of Rabbi Yaakov Kopl Chosid of Kolomyia, a disciple of the Baal Shem Tov
Grand Rabbi Chayim Hager of Kosov (1755-1854), author of Toras Chayim—son of Rabbi Menachem Mendel
Grand Rabbi Yaakov Shimshon Hager of Kosov (1814-1880)—son of Rabbi Chayim, continued the dynasty in Kosov
Grand Rabbi Moshe Hager of Kosov (1860-1925), author of Leket Oni—son of Rabbi Yaakov Shimshon
Grand Rabbi Shraga Feivish Hager of Zalishtshik (1870-1937)—son-in-law of Rabbi Moshe of Kosov and son of Rabbi Boruch of Vizhnitz
Grand Rabbi Avraham Yehoshua Heshel Hager of Kosov-Zalishtshik (died 1999)—son of Rabbi Shraga Feivish of Zalishtshik
Grand Rabbi Shraga Feivish Hager, present Kosover Rebbe of Boro Park—son of Rabbi Avraham Yehoshua Heschel of Kosov
Grand Rabbi Yosef Alter Hager of Radovitz
Grand Rabbi Menachem Mendel Hager of Vizhnitz, author of Tzemach Tzaddik, son of Rabbi Chayim, founder of the Vizhnitz branch of the Kosov dynasty.See Vizhnitz (Hasidic dynasty)
Grand Rabbi David Hager of Zablitov, son of Rabbi Menachem Mendel

Further reading
 Benjamin Brown, 'Individualism, truth and the repudiation of magic as the tsadik's prerogative - Pshiskhe-like Elements in the Theology of Rabbi Menahem Mendel of Kosov'

See also

Vizhnitz (Hasidic dynasty)
History of the Jews in Poland
History of the Jews in Galicia (Central Europe)
History of the Jews in Ukraine

References 

Hasidic dynasties
Hasidic Judaism in New York City
Jewish Galician (Eastern Europe) history
Jews and Judaism in Brooklyn
Jews and Judaism in Switzerland
Vizhnitz (Hasidic dynasty)